Fire of Love is a 2022 independent documentary film about the lives and careers of volcanologists Katia and Maurice Krafft. Directed, written, and produced by Sara Dosa, the film had its world premiere at the 2022 Sundance Film Festival on January 20, 2022, where it won the Jonathan Oppenheim Editing Award. It was released on July 6, 2022, by National Geographic Documentary Films and Neon. It received acclaim from critics, and was nominated for Best Documentary Feature at the 95th Academy Awards.

Synopsis
The film follows the lives and careers of daring French volcanologists Katia and Maurice Krafft, who ultimately die in the 1991 Mount Unzen eruption, via archival footage.

Production
In March 2021, it was announced Sara Dosa would direct a documentary film revolving around Katia and Maurice Krafft. In January 2022, it was announced Miranda July would serve as the narrator.

Release
The film had its world premiere at the 2022 Sundance Film Festival on January 20, 2022 where it won the Jonathan Oppenheim Editing Award in the U.S. Documentary category. Shortly after, National Geographic Documentary Films acquired distribution rights to the film, winning a bidding war against Netflix, Amazon Studios, Sony Pictures Classics, IFC Films, Universal Pictures and Paramount Pictures. It also screened at South by Southwest on March 11, 2022. In April 2022, it was announced Neon would co-distribute the film. The film was released on SVOD to Disney+ on November 11, 2022.

Reception

Box office
In the United States and Canada, the film earned $22,416 from three theaters in its opening weekend.

Critical response
On Rotten Tomatoes, it has an approval rating of 98% based on 173 reviews, with an average rating of 8.3/10. The website's critics consensus reads, "Whether as a story of one couple's quixotic quest or simply a stunning collection of nature footage, Fire of Love burns bright." On Metacritic, the film holds a weighted average score of 83 out of 100, based on 38 critics, indicating "universal acclaim".

Accolades

Feature film adaptation
In March 2023, Searchlight Pictures announced a feature film adaptation with Hunting Lane Films, Submarine Deluxe and Sandbox Films set to produce.

References

External links
 
 Official website
 Official trailer

2022 films
2022 documentary films
American documentary films
Canadian documentary films
Collage film
Documentary films about geology
Documentary films about marriage
Documentary films about nature
Documentary films about volcanoes
Films set in Iceland
Films set in Japan
Films set in Sicily
Films set in Washington (state)
Mount St. Helens
National Geographic Society films
Neon (distributor) films
Sundance Film Festival award winners
Volcanology
2020s Canadian films
2020s American films
2022 independent films